Heaviside layer may refer to:
 Kennelly–Heaviside layer, a layer in the Earth's atmosphere
 A fictional afterlife in the musical, Cats